Machilinus aurantiacus is a species of rock bristletail in the family Meinertellidae. It is found in North America. Adults are 6-8 mm in length and covered in silvery scales. Legs are yellow-brown. This species is diurnally active.

Subspecies
These two subspecies belong to the species Machilinus aurantiacus:
 Machilinus aurantiacus aurantiacus (Schött, 1897)
 Machilinus aurantiacus setosus Sturm & Bach, 1992

References

Further reading

 
 
 

Archaeognatha
Articles created by Qbugbot
Insects described in 1897